Noël Oliver Studer (born 18 October 1996) is a Swiss chess grandmaster. He was Swiss Chess Champion in 2016, and again in 2019.

Chess career
Born in 1996, Studer earned his international master title in 2014 and his grandmaster title in 2017. His achievement of the latter title at the age of 20 makes him Switzerland's youngest ever grandmaster. He is the No. 2 ranked Swiss player as of October 2021.

In 2019, Studer won the Accentus Young Masters, held from 27 February to 7 March. He won his first five games, and finished one point clear of the rest of the field with 7½/9 (+6–0=3).

On August 5th 2021, Studer announced he would be retiring from competitive chess at the start of 2022, citing health problems, and the want to focus on other career paths. 
He is now creating Chess improvement content on his blog https://www.nextlevelchess.blog which he started on March 28th 2021, with the goal of sharing his knowledge attained in 6+ years as a chess professional.

References

External links

1996 births
Living people
Chess grandmasters
Sportspeople from Bern
Swiss chess players